In enzymology, a bile-acid-CoA hydrolase is an enzyme that catalyzes the chemical reaction

deoxycholoyl-CoA + H2O  CoA + deoxycholate

Thus, the two substrates of this enzyme are deoxycholoyl-CoA and H2O, whereas its two products are CoA and deoxycholate.

This enzyme belongs to the family of hydrolases, specifically those acting on thioester bonds.  The systematic name of this enzyme class is deoxycholoyl-CoA hydrolase.

References

 

EC 3.1.2
Enzymes of unknown structure